The Great Lover is a 1920 American silent drama film directed by Frank Lloyd and starring John St. Polis, Richard Tucker and Claire Adams.

The film is based on the play, "The Great Lover," by Leo Ditrichstein,                                     Frederic Hatton and                                     Fanny Hatton, which premiered on Broadway on November 10, 1915.

Plot summary

Cast
 John St. Polis as Jean Paurel 
 Richard Tucker as Ward 
 Claire Adams as Ethel 
 John Davidson as Sonino 
 Alice Hollister as Bianca 
 Lionel Belmore as Impresario 
 Rose Dione as Sabotini 
 Tom Ricketts as Potter 
 Frederick Vroom as Doctor 
 Gino Corrado as Secretary

References

Bibliography
 Goble, Alan. The Complete Index to Literary Sources in Film. Walter de Gruyter, 1999.

External links
 
 
 
 

1920 films
1920 drama films
Silent American drama films
Films directed by Frank Lloyd
American silent feature films
1920s English-language films
Goldwyn Pictures films
American black-and-white films
1920s American films